Carl Copeland Cundiff (March 29, 1941, New Orleans - ?) was the American Ambassador to Niger from 1988 to 1991.  He was nominated by Ronald Reagan to succeed Richard Wayne Bogosian.

A career foreign service officer since 1965 he served in a variety of overseas locations such as Singapore, Saigon, Vietnam, and Paris, France among other posts. 

Cundiff graduated from the University of the South with a  B.A. in 1963) followed by several degrees from the Fletcher School of Law and Diplomacy (M.A., 1964; M.A.L.D., 1965; Ph.D., 1968).  He also attended Harvard University’s Kennedy School of Government, graduating with a M.P.A. in 1974.

References

Ambassadors of the United States to Niger
Living people
1941 births
United States Foreign Service personnel
Sewanee: The University of the South alumni
The Fletcher School at Tufts University alumni
Harvard Kennedy School alumni